Eupithecia fulvipennis is a moth in the  family Geometridae. It is found in India and Nepal.

References

Moths described in 1889
fulvipennis
Moths of Asia